A Horn Sonata is a sonata for horn. Horn sonatas include:

 Horn Sonata (Beethoven)
 Horn Sonata No. 1 (Danzi)
 Horn Sonata No. 2 (Danzi)